Up Country Lions SC is a Sri Lankan professional football club based in Nawalapitiya. They play in the topflight football league of Sri Lanka, the Sri Lanka Champions League and Sri lanka Super League.

External links 

Football clubs in Sri Lanka